Matiu / Somes Island is the largest of three islands in the northern half of Wellington Harbour, New Zealand. It was the site of military and quarantine internments, as well as animal quarantine until 1995. Since 1995, it has been designated as a scientific and historic reserve. Following environmental restoration and the translocation of species, the island is now home to many native birds, invertebrates, reptiles and plants.

In 2009, the ownership of the island was transferred to the iwi Taranaki Whānui ki Te Upoko o Te Ika, as part of cultural redress for Taranaki Whānui included in the settlement of their claims against the Crown for breaches of the Treaty of Waitangi. The island is managed by the Department of Conservation.

Toponymy 

Legend has it that Matiu and Mākaro islands received their original, Māori names from Kupe, the semi-legendary first navigator to reach New Zealand and return home with knowledge of the new land. He named them after his two daughters (or, in some versions of the tale, nieces) when he first entered the harbour about 1000 years ago.

After European settlement, the island was known for over a century as Somes Island. In 1839 it fell under the control of the New Zealand Company along with much of the greater Wellington region. The island was renamed after Joseph Somes, the company's deputy-governor and financier at the time. In 1997, the New Zealand Geographic Board assigned the official bilingual name of Matiu / Somes Island in recognition of the island's colourful European and Māori histories. Since then the board has adopted the formatting convention of placing a space before and after the slash, so the official name is now written Mātiu / Somes Island.

History

Māori history 
During the 18th century Ngāti Ira, an East Coast iwi, settled in Petone and around the eastern shores of the harbour. They built two pā on the island but there was no permanent settlement on the island due to limited resources. Ngāti Mutunga and Ngāti Tama from Taranaki drove Ngāti Ira from their settlements in the 1820s.

In November 1835 Ngāti Mutunga people, affiliated to Te Āti Awa, seized the ship Lord Rodney at Wellington and got its captain John Harewood to take them to the island. The crew were tied up and Harewood was forced or bribed to take a group of hundreds of Māori to the Chatham Islands. To ensure his compliance, his chief mate was held hostage on Matiu / Somes island. There was no Māori occupation on Matiu / Somes from about 1840.

Archaeological sites 
At the northern end of the island on a site with steep cliffs there was the Te Moana–a–kura pā which contained terraces and middens. Haowhenua pā was built in the middle of the island, where the quarantine station was sited but the only remaining sign of occupation was a midden. The midden, which was underneath the hospital building, was uncovered and excavated during building work in 1999. Faunal remains included shellfish (species from the mainland), fish and bird bones.

European history 

At various times throughout the 19th and 20th centuries the island hosted quarantine facilities for both human immigrants and animals, and enemy alien internees during wartime.

Human quarantine 
In 1868 the island was declared a quarantine ground and used to isolate passengers from a ship carrying smallpox. When the immigrant ship England arrived in 1872 carrying several passengers with smallpox, passengers and crew were quartered in makeshift accommodation on the island. On other occasions, new arrivals would spend ten minutes in a smokehouse of chlorine, potassium nitrate and sulphur fumes for de-lousing. Forty-five people are known to be buried on the island, mostly immigrants who arrived in the 1870s. In 1971 individual gravestones were removed from the overgrown cemetery and replaced with a large memorial. In January 2000 four of the old headstones were retrieved from storage and placed next to the communal memorial.

Animal quarantine 
The use of the island as an animal quarantine facility is recorded as early as 1864, when James Sellars quarantined sheep.In 1889 Matiu / Somes Island was declared as the first animal quarantine station in New Zealand. In 1892 the government established a Department of Agriculture to protect New Zealand's farming industry, and in 1893 passed the Stock Act. The Stock Act 1893 gave the Department of Agriculture power to quarantine all live animals arriving in the country, so it built permanent animal quarantine facilities on Matiu / Somes Island (in 1893) and at other locations for this purpose. In 1916, aliens interned on the island built stables for the quarantine station.

In 1968 a maximum security animal quarantine station was built. It closed in 1995 after in-vitro fertilisation technology had developed, making importation and quarantining of live breeding stock unnecessary.

World War I internment camp 

During World War I the island continued to be used for quarantining animals but was also used for an internment camp which imprisoned about 300 "enemy aliens". Prisoners during this time included many German prisoners of war and suspected Danish imposter Hjelmar von Danneville. Other "enemy aliens" included German residents of New Zealand who were considered dangerous or who were reservists in the German or Austrian armies, sailors who had been at sea when war broke out, Germans from Samoa and musicians in a German band. In April 1916 there were 246 prisoners on the island, of whom 94 were military and 152 were civilians, and by May 1918 there were 314 internees. In March 1915 two prisoners escaped from the island by swimming to Petone, and in July 1918 four men escaped on a raft made of wood with oil drums for buoyancy, landing at Ngauranga. An inquiry was held towards the end of the war into numerous accusations of mistreatment of alien internees on the island. After the war ended the island reverted to use as a quarantine station.

World War II internment camp 
On 29 August 1939 Matiu / Somes island was handed over from the Health Department to the Army and again shifted from quarantine station to internment camp, with the first group of internees arriving in December 1939. Internees included German and Italian residents of New Zealand and men from Pacific Islands plantations. By January 1942 there were also 45 Japanese internees who were New Zealand residents and fishermen from Suva. Tensions developed amongst the various national groups, in particular between German Nazis and German Jews. As in World War 1, there were allegations of ill-treatment of the men on the island. Three men escaped in November 1941 in a boat stolen from the island's caretaker and made it to the Akatarawa hills before hunger forced them out to buy food and they were rearrested.

In 1942, the island was fortified with heavy anti-aircraft gun emplacements on the summit, but they were never used. This whole area was levelled flat for the purpose of this construction, with the result that  was removed from the island's previous overall height. A degaussing station was built to provide protection for ships against magnetic mines. Many of the physical features of these sites are present on the island today. The Swiss Consul in 1942 protested that with military equipment on the island it had become a potential target and that keeping prisoners in a potential conflict zone was against the Geneva Convention. The Government moved the internees to a camp at Pahiatua, but in September 1944 this was needed for Polish refugee children so the prisoners were sent back to Matiu / Somes Island (apart from the Italians who had been allowed to return to their families after Italy signed an armistice in March 1944). At the end of the war the internees were released and allowed to stay in New Zealand if they wished, since Europe was in a mess.

Quarantine station to scientific reserve 
From 1947 to 1995 the island was used as a quarantine station for livestock, with limited access to the public from 1981 onwards.

Matiu/Somes became part of Lower Hutt in 1989 and came under the full control of the Department of Conservation (DOC) as a scientific and historic reserve in August 1995.

Transfer of ownership 

In 2009, the ownership of the island was transferred to the iwi Taranaki Whānui ki Te Upoko o Te Ika. The transfer of ownership was part of cultural redress for Taranaki Whānui included in the settlement of their claims against the Crown for breaches of the Treaty of Waitangi. Following the passing of the Port Nicholson Block (Taranaki Whānui ki Te Upoko o Te Ika) Claims Settlement Act 2009, ownership of the island is vested in the trustees of the Port Nicholson Block Settlement Trust. A kaitiaki plan (or management plan) was prepared in 2012, to guide the administration of the harbour islands scientific and historic reserves, in accordance with the Reserves Act 1977.

A waharoa, or carved gateway, named Tane Te Waiora was unveiled adjacent to the wharf at the entrance to the island in 2017.

Geography 

Just off the northern tip of Matiu / Somes Island lies tiny Mokopuna Island, also known as Leper Island.

A distinct gully runs from the south of the former quarantine station and terminates at the sea on the southern end of the island between two largely forested ridges on either side to the east and west. Generally, this gully is a swampy area but it also represents an ephemeral watercourse and during and following heavy rain a small creek flows down it. A 1942 map shows a small dam across the creek.

Environmental restoration 
The Royal Forest and Bird Protection Society of New Zealand (Forest & Bird) has been revegetating the island since 1984 and successfully eradicated rats and mice between 1988 and 1989. Red-crowned kākāriki (parakeets) from Kapiti Island were re-introduced in 2003 and 2004. North Island robins sourced from Kapiti Island were released in April 2006; they bred for the first time in late September that year and this was viewed as encouraging by DOC staff as it appeared to indicate that the island ecosystem represents a suitable habitat for this species. The island is a stronghold for the little blue penguin, the spotted shag and black shag,  the red-billed gull, and several rare and endangered species of plants.

Between 2012 and 2014, 237 fluttering shearwater chicks were translocated from the Marlborough Sounds to Matiu / Somes Island and hand-fed until they fledged. Some of the now-adult birds have since returned to the island and begun to breed.  A solar-powered speaker system was also installed to transmit fluttering shearwater calls each night, and has attracted wild birds to Matiu / Somes Island. This species is common in Wellington Harbour but there has been no local breeding population since pre-European times. They were once an important food source for local iwi.

There are more than 500 species of invertebrates on the island including three species of wētā. Wellington tree wētā were transferred to Matiu / Somes Island in 1996 and 1997, and 67 Cook Strait giant wētā were successfully transferred from Mana Island in 1996. A species of small ground wētā had survived on Matiu / Somes Island after deforestation.

The island is now home to several species of native reptiles, including the common skink (Oligosoma nigriplantare), spotted skink (Oligosoma lineoocellatum), copper skink (Cyclodina aenea) and common gecko (Hoplodactylus maculatus). Twenty-five forest geckos (Mokopirirakau granulatus) were transferred to the island in April 2005, and more than 90 Wellington green geckos (Naultinus punctatus) were released in several transfers between 2006 and 2013. Two of these geckos were fitted with transmitters so that they could be monitored after release. In 2015 the green geckos were confirmed to be breeding on the island. Tuatara are known to have been living on Matiu / Somes island in the 1840s but later died out. In 1998 the Brothers Island tuatara was released on the island, and by 2007 had begun breeding there.

Many of these projects have been supported by the community and the local iwi, Taranaki Whānui. The Matiu / Somes Island Charitable Trust was established in 1998 as a partnership between local iwi and the general community to help protect, nurture and enhance the island by raising funds for projects that increased biodiversity and enhance visitors' enjoyment of the island. Through its active arm, "The Friends of Matiu / Somes", it encourages community participation in work on the island. It also works closely with DOC and community groups such as Forest & Bird.

Transport 
Scheduled ferry services from the Wellington CBD to Matiu / Somes Island and Days Bay operate as part of ferries in Wellington, landing at the main wharf at the northeast of the island. An electric ferry was introduced in 2022. Visitors arriving in private boats may only land at the main wharf or nearby beach, and must check in at the whare kiore ('rat house') to have their bags inspected.

Tourism 
Matiu / Somes Island is an increasingly popular tourist attraction and educational resource for local schools, with about 15,000 visitors per year. The island is free of introduced mammalian predators such as stoats. Visitors to the island must make sure they are pest-free. Before arriving they must check, clean and seal all gear to make sure no pests, soil, or seeds are brought to the island. Visitors may stay overnight on the island in a house built in the 1970s and managed by the Department of Conservation, or in a tent at one of 12 campsites.

Just to the north lies a much smaller island, Mokopuna Island. To protect endemic wildlife present – particularly nesting seabirds – landing by members of the public is prohibited here.

Matiu / Somes Island lighthouse

The Matiu / Somes Island lighthouse is a harbour navigation light for Wellington Harbour. It is a sector light, marking a safe approach through the harbour channel. The first lighthouse on the site was established in 1866. It was the first inner harbour lighthouse in New Zealand, and one of only eight lighthouses nationwide at that time. However, by 1895 there were multiple complaints that it was inadequate. A replacement lighthouse with a more powerful light was built on an adjacent site and commissioned on 21 February 1900. The light was automated on 1 April 1924 and converted to electricity after 1945.

Matiu / Somes Island in the arts
Maurice Gee's book Live Bodies was set in part on Matiu / Somes Island, with the main character spending time interned there during the Second World War.

Melanie Drewery's book for children Papa's Island  tells the story of a family caught up in the internment of "enemy aliens" on Matiu / Somes Island.

David McGill's spy novel The Death Ray Debacle is based on a true story about Victor Penny, an Auckland bus garage attendant and amateur radio enthusiast who in 1935 managed to convince government authorities that he could produce a 'death ray' that was capable of stopping an army, immobilising trucks, and bringing down enemy aeroplanes in flight. Penny was placed under the protection of defence authorities initially on Matiu / Somes Island and later at Fort Dorset.

In 2013 Bard Productions staged an adaptation of Shakespeare's The Tempest on Matiu / Somes Island, with the boat journey across to the island forming part of the play. Scenes took place at the animal quarantine station and in the open air.

See also 
 List of islands of New Zealand

References

Further reading 
 Buchanan, Rachel (2011) 'Re-making Memory on Matiu and Other “Settlement” Sites' Memory Connection, Vol 1, no. 1: 284–300.
 Port Nicholson Block Settlement Trust and Department of Conservation. (2012) Mātiu–Makāro–Mokopuna, Wellington Harbour Islands Kaitiaki Management Plan 2012–2017. 
 "Matiu/Somes island- Scientific and historic reserve", general information brochure published by the Department of Conservation and the Matiu Somes charitable trust
 Hansford, Dave (2005) 'Matiu / Somes – secrets in plain view' Forest and Bird magazine, no. 318 :14–17.

External links

Map of Somes Island in 1942, showing natural and man-made features and topography

Parks in New Zealand
Parks in the Wellington Region
Island restoration
Islands of the Wellington Region
Wellington Harbour